The 2022 South American Basketball Championship for Women was the 37th edition of the tournament. Eight teams was featured in the competition, held at Arena La Pedrera in Villa Mercedes and Estadio Ave Fénix in San Luis, Argentina from August 1 to 6.

Preliminary round

Group A

Group B

Classification 5th–8th places

Semifinals 5th–8th

Classification 7th–8th

Classification 5th–6th

Final round

Semifinals

Third place game

Final

Final standings

References

External links
Official website

2022 in women's basketball
Women
2022 in Argentine women's sport
International basketball competitions hosted by Argentina
South American Basketball Championship for Women
August 2022 sports events in Argentina